Janne Virtanen (born 16 November 1969) is a Finnish former strongman who won the World's Strongest Man championship in 2000. He was runner-up in 1999 and finished third in 2001. His other championships include four-time Finland's Strongest Man (1998, 1999, 2000, 2001), Helsinki Grand Prix (2000), and the Turkey Grand Prix in 2002 in Istanbul. Following his second consecutive failure to reach the final of the World's Strongest Man in 2007, he announced his retirement but entered into the third qualifying heat of the competition in 2008. He currently earns his living as a carpenter in Finland.

Personal Records
Deadlift: 365 kg (804 lbs)

Completed contests
1999 World's Strongest Man-Valletta, Malta - 2nd place
2000 World's Strongest Man-Sun City, South Africa - winner
2001 World's Strongest Man-Victoria Falls, Zambia - 3rd place

References

Living people
Finnish strength athletes
1969 births
Place of birth missing (living people)
Sportspeople from Espoo